Francis Michael Kennedy (31 July 1920 – 27 December 1990) was an Australian rules footballer who played with Melbourne in the Victorian Football League (VFL).

Family
The son of Michael Francis Kennedy (1890-1971), and Ann Maree Kennedy (1892-1977), née Maher, Francis Michael Kennedy was born at Vervale, Victoria on 31 July 1920.

He married Agnes May Stout (1920-1989) in 1946.

Football
Kennedy's first contact with the Melbourne Football Club was on 2 April 1940, 1940, when -- described as a "new man" from "Vervale, Gippsland"  -- he took part in the team's training.

In 1944, he was listed as a "new" player -- from the Melbourne Seconds -- in Melbourne's final training list for the 1944 season, and made his debut for Melbourne's First XVIII against Richmond, at Punt Road, on 6 May 1944, and was considered to be Melbourne's best player (in a losing team).

"Frank Kennedy, from Garfield, was not so conspicuous against Essendon [in round 3, on 4 May 1946], but was one of Melbourne's best the previous week [viz., round 2, on 27 April 1946, his first senior match in the 1946 season] at Carlton.Playing on a half-forward flank, his leading-out, and general approach to the ball, were features. His present form should keep him in the side." -- "Clubman", 8 May 1946.

Kennedy was a reserve in Melbourne's losing 1946 VFL Grand Final team. He came onto the field in the final quarter, and was reported for striking and suspended for four matches.

Military service
He served in the Australian Army in World War II from July 1943 to February 1945.

Death
He died at Garfield, Victoria on 27 December 1990.

Notes

References
 
 World War Two Nominal Roll: Private Francis Michael Kennedy (VX137119), Department of Veterans' Affairs.
 B883, VX137119: World War Two Service Record: Private Francis Michael Kennedy (VX137119), National Archives of Australia.

External links 
 
 
 Frank Kennedy, at Demonwiki.

1920 births
1990 deaths
Australian rules footballers from Victoria (Australia)
Melbourne Football Club players